Kysuce Protected Landscape Area is one of the 14 protected landscape areas in Slovakia. It is made of two separate parts, the Javorníky mountains in the west, and Kysucké Beskydy mountains in the east, in north-western Slovakia. It is situated in the Čadca and Kysucké Nové Mesto districts, within the Kysuce region. It borders three other protected areas: the Beskydy Protected Landscape Area in the Czech Republic, Żywiec Landscape Park in Poland and Horná Orava Protected Landscape Area in Slovakia.

History
The park was created on 23 May 1984. Protected areas declared before include Čierna Lutiša (1972), Veľká Rača (1976), Veľký Javorník (1967), and Vychylovské skálie (1983).

Geography, geology and biology
More than half of the PLA's territory is covered by forests. Geologically, it is made of low-resistant sandstone layers. Due to the Vlach colonization, the area has a mosaic character, with alternating hamlets with original folk architecture, meadows, fields and forests. Curiosities of the region include crude oil spring near Korňa and mysterious sandstone balls.
The area is near the westernmost border of area of great predators of Slovakia, such as the wolf, bear and lynx. A Carpathian endemic species living in the area is the Carpathian newt.

Attractions
Attractions in the park include the Vychylovka (part of Nová Bystrica) switchback forest railway and Kysuce open-air museum.

References

External links
Kysuce PLA at Slovakia.travel
Description of the Kysuce PLA at The Slovak State Nature Conservancy 

Protected areas of Slovakia
Protected areas established in 1984
Protected areas of the Western Carpathians
Tourist attractions in Žilina Region
Geography of Žilina Region